Angelo John Poffo (April 10, 1925 – March 4, 2010) was an American professional wrestler and wrestling promoter. He ran International Championship Wrestling for a number of years, holding cards in Tennessee, Kentucky and Arkansas.  He was the father of "Macho Man" Randy Savage and "The Genius" Lanny Poffo and the father-in-law of Miss Elizabeth.

Early life, family and education
Poffo was born in Downers Grove, Illinois (near Chicago) to Italian immigrants.

Poffo attended DePaul University and was a catcher for its baseball team. He studied physical education and was a competitive chess player.

He enlisted in the Navy during World War II where in 1945, he set a world record for sit-ups. He completed 6,033 sit-ups in four hours and ten minutes. According to his son Lanny, after 6,000 sit-ups he did 33 more, one for each year of Jesus's life.

Professional wrestling career
Poffo started wrestling in 1948 at Karl Pojello's gym in Illinois. His first match was in 1949 against Ruffy Silverstein.  He sometimes wrestled as "the Masked Miser" and managed other wrestlers as "the Miser". He became a villainous character for the first time in 1950. In the mid-1950s, Bronco Lubich acted as his manager. He won the NWA United States Heavyweight Championship (Chicago version) in 1958.

He formed a villainous tag team with Chris Markoff called "The Devil's Duo" in 1966, and they were managed by Bobby "The Brain" Heenan. Prior to that, in 1964 he briefly teamed with Nicoli Volkoff (often confused with Nikolai Volkoff, who did not begin wrestling in the US until 1970) and held the WWA tag team championship. In 1973, he formed the team "The Graduates" with Ken Dillinger.

Poffo wrestled in the 1970s and 1980s under a mask as "the Carpet Bagger" for Emile Dupree's Atlantic Grand Prix Wrestling in the Maritime Provinces of Canada. He also bought into the promotion, when his sons were old enough to join. He wrestled wearing a yellow mask with a dollar sign on the forehead and a blue sequined ring jacket with a big dollar sign on the back. In addition, Poffo ran International Championship Wrestling from 1979 to 1983 in Kentucky.

According to Poffo's son Lanny, Vince McMahon declined to include Poffo in a 1987 World Wrestling Federation event featuring legends.  Lanny Poffo claims that this decision caused an early rift in the relationship between McMahon and Poffo's other son, Randy Savage. His last match was in 1991 against Luis Martinez.

He made a few appearances in World Championship Wrestling (WCW) in 1995 managing his son, Randy Savage. At Slamboree 1995, Poffo became involved in his son's feud with "The Nature Boy" Ric Flair, who put him in a figure four leglock. At the event, he was inducted into the WCW Hall of Fame as a member of the class of 1995.

Personal life
During Poffo's time in college, he met another student at DePaul, Judith (Judy) nee Sverdlin from Naperville, Illinois; they wed on June 6, 1949. They were married for more than 60 years, and together they had two sons, Randy (1952–2011) and Lanny (1954–2023), both professional wrestlers. After retiring from professional wrestling, Poffo taught physical education in Illinois. His son Randy would also do things for him and his wife Judy, sending them on trips to Japan and Europe and Israel until they told him they were too tired to travel. On Angelo’s 70th birthday, Randy paid $50,000 to buy his father a yellow Cadillac automobile, the same car the elder Poffo had purchased in 1959 and drove around the wrestling circuit for 200,000 miles. When Angelo was sick, Randy installed an invalid toilet and walk-in bathtub in his parents’ home. He was also known for saving money to help provide his family.

On March 4, 2010, Poffo died in his sleep at age 84. His son Randy told the Tampa Bay Times, “I have always been proud to call Angelo Poffo my father, he is a great example of a self-sacrificing, hard-working man who always put his family first. He has always been my hero and my mentor, and the priceless gifts he gave I will have and cherish forever.”

He is buried at Queen of Heaven Catholic Cemetery in Hillside, Illinois, near his hometown Downers Grove.

Championships and accomplishments
Atlantic Grand Prix Wrestling
AGPW North American Tag Team Championship (1 time) with Cuban Assassin
Cauliflower Alley Club
Other honoree (1996)
Fred Kohler Enterprises
NWA Midwest Heavyweight Championship (7 times)
NWA United States Heavyweight Championship (Chicago version) (1 time)
NWA Midwest Tag Team Championship (1 time) – with Bronco Lubich
International Championship Wrestling
ICW Television Championship (1 time)
NWA Detroit
NWA World Tag Team Championship (Detroit version) (1 time) – with Lanny Poffo
Southwest Sports, Inc.
NWA Texas Tag Team Championship (1 time) – with Bronco Lubich
World Championship Wrestling
WCW Hall of Fame (Class of 1995)
World Wrestling Association
WWA World Tag Team Championship (3 times) – with Chris Markoff (2), Nicoli Volkoff (1)

References

External links
Profile at Online World of Wrestling
 

American expatriate sportspeople in Canada
American male professional wrestlers
American professional wrestlers of Italian descent
DePaul Blue Demons baseball players
People from Downers Grove, Illinois
Professional wrestling trainers
1925 births
2010 deaths
The Heenan Family members
Professional wrestling promoters
United States Navy personnel of World War II
20th-century professional wrestlers